The Devin Hydro Power Plant is an active hydro power project in Devin, Bulgaria. It has 2 individual turbines with a nominal output of 40 MW which will deliver up to 80 MW of power.

External links

References

Hydroelectric power stations in Bulgaria
Buildings and structures in Smolyan Province